Roeseliana is a genus of bush cricket or katydid in the subfamily Tettigoniinae. Species in this genus were placed at various times in the genera Metrioptera and Bicolorana, until Roeseliana was restored in 2011.

Species
These species belong to the genus Roeseliana:
 Roeseliana ambitiosa (Uvarov, 1924)
 Roeseliana azami (Finot, 1892)
 Roeseliana bispina (Bolívar, 1899)
 Roeseliana brunneri Ramme, 1951
 Roeseliana fedtschenkoi (Saussure, 1874)
 Roeseliana oporina (Bolívar, 1887)
 Roeseliana pylnovi (Uvarov, 1924)
 Roeseliana roeselii (Hagenbach, 1822) - type species

References

Further reading

 

Tettigoniinae
Ensifera genera